The 2013 FIVB Volleyball Women's U23 World Championship was held in Tijuana and Mexicali, Mexico, for seven days from 5 to 12 October 2013. This was the first edition of the tournament. China won the tournament and Yao Di was selected Most Valuable Player.

Competition Formula
The competition format saw the 12 teams split into two pools of six teams playing in round robin format. The semifinals featured the top two teams from each pool. The FIVB Volleyball Women’s U23 World Championship featured two countries per confederation plus the host Mexico and the highest country in the world rankings not already selected by their confederation, in this case USA.

Qualified teams
Each Confederation was allowed to enter two teams into the competition. The qualification criteria were left to the discretion of each continental confederation.

Germany was invited as Wild Card after Algeria from the African Confederation withdrew from the competition.

Pool Composition
First six teams were seeded according to their Senior World Ranking number as of October 2013, the other 6 were seeded by draw.

Venues
High Performance Sports Center of Baja California, Tijuana, Mexico – Pool A and Final Round
Auditorio del Estado, Mexicali, Mexico – Pool B and Final Round

Preliminary round

Pool A

|}

|}

Pool B

|}

|}

Final round

5th to 8th bracket

Classification 5th and 8th

|}

Classification 7th 

|}

Classification 5th 

 
|}

Championship bracket

Semifinals 

|}

Bronze medal match 

|}

Gold medal match 

|}

Final standing

All-star team

Most Valuable Player

Best Setter

Best Outside Hitters

Best Opposite

Best Middle Blockers

Best Libero

References

External links

FIVB Volleyball Women's U23 World Championship
2013 in Mexican sports
International volleyball competitions hosted by Mexico
2013 in volleyball
2017 in Mexican women's sports
2013 in women's volleyball